Tarachand Sahu (1 January 1947 – 11 November 2012) was a member of the 14th Lok Sabha of India.
He represented the Durg constituency of Chhattisgarh and was a member of the Bharatiya Janata Party (BJP) political party.

Sahu was elected twice to the undivided Madhya Pradesh Assembly in 1990 and 1993 from Gunderdehi constituency in Durg district on BJP ticket.
He made his debut in Lok Sabha from Durg in 1996 and continued to retain the seat in 1998, 1999 and 2004 elections.

Sahu, who was expelled from the BJP three months before the 2009 Lok Sabha polls for his anti-party activities, was virtually playing the lead role for formation of a third front in the state by uniting the NCP, the LJP, the Samajwadi Party, the Chhattisgarh Mukti Morcha, the Gondwana Ganatantra Party and other regional parties to fight against ruling BJP and opposition Congress in the assembly elections due next year. So to gain Chhattisgarhi leader's influence in State Politics he founded Chhattisgarh Swabhiman Manch (CSM) as a third front fighting for Chhattisgarhi Swabhiman.

Expressing their shock over the sudden demise of the leader, former Union Minister and suspended Congress leader Arvind Netam said the death of Sahu has come as a huge blow to the movement, which had just taken shape after several rounds of discussion with all these parties.

References

External links
 www.cgswabhimanmanch.com/

1947 births
2012 deaths
India MPs 2004–2009
Bharatiya Janata Party politicians from Chhattisgarh
People from Durg district
India MPs 1996–1997
India MPs 1998–1999
India MPs 1999–2004
Lok Sabha members from Chhattisgarh